Onur Bayramoğlu (born 4 January 1990) is a Turkish professional footballer who plays for Eskişehirspor.

Early career
He grew up in a sporty family, as father was a former footballer and national table tennis player, his mother was volleyball player. He began his football career in 2001 at Eskişehir DSİ Bentspor. In 2008, he signed for Bozüyükspor who play in the Turkish second tier, and played 17 games, scoring 2 goals, during 2008–2009 season.   His manager İsmail Ertekin likened his playing style to that of Kaká.

Beşiktaş
On 4 August 2009 he signed a 5-year contract with Beşiktaş.

International career
Onur has represented Turkey at youth level. He played his first game for Turkey U19 on 25 March 2009, against Russia.

Honours
Beşiktaş
Turkish Cup : 2010-11

References

External links
 Onur Bayramoğlu Profile on TFF
 
 
 Onur Bayramoğlu at Soccerway

1990 births
Living people
Turkish footballers
Turkey youth international footballers
Süper Lig players
Bozüyükspor footballers
Beşiktaş J.K. footballers
Gençlerbirliği S.K. footballers
Sportspeople from Eskişehir
Eskişehirspor footballers
MKE Ankaragücü footballers
Association football midfielders